Paratelmatobius is a genus of frogs in the family Leptodactylidae. They are endemic to southern Brazil.

Species 
The following species are recognised in the genus Paratelmatobius :

AmphibiaWeb also lists Paratelmatobius pictiventris, but Amphibian Species of the World considers it a synonym of Paratelmatobius gaigeae.

References 

 
Leptodactylidae
Amphibians of South America
Endemic fauna of Brazil
Amphibian genera
Taxa named by Bertha Lutz
Taxonomy articles created by Polbot